Bechler is a surname of German origin. Notable people with the surname include:

Carl Bechler (1886–unknown), German athlete
Gustavus R. Bechler, cartographer and explorer
Helmut Bechler (1898–1971), German military officer
John Christian Bechler (1784–1857), Moravian bishop and composer
Lynn Bechler, member of the Kentucky House of Representatives
Steve Bechler (1979–2003), American baseball player

See also
Belcher (disambiguation), a French surname
Bechler River, a river in Yellowstone National Park named for Gustavus R. Bechler
Bechler Falls, a waterfall in Yellowstone National Park named for Gustavus R. Bechler

Surnames
German-language surnames
Surnames of German origin